Polycarpus II (Greek: Πολύκαρπος Βʹ, died 144) was the bishop of Byzantium. According to ancient sources, he remained in office for seventeen years, but Church historian Nikiforos Kallistos mentions that Polycarpus II was the bishop of Byzantium for three years (141–144 AD). He succeeded Bishop Felix. He was in office during the rule of Emperor Antoninus Pius. His successor was Athenodorus.

The relics of Polycarpus II were kept in a coffin made of marble.

Sources

www.ec-patr.org

2nd-century Romans
2nd-century Byzantine bishops
Bishops of Byzantium
144 deaths
Year of birth unknown